Robert J. Ulrich is an American casting director and producer active since the 1980s and best known for casting television shows including Glee, The Boys, Zoey's Extraordinary Playlist, Supernatural, Battlestar Galactica, CSI, Diagnosis: Murder and Matlock. He has also cast most Ryan Murphy productions since Popular in 1999. He has been nominated for eight Emmy Awards, winning a Primetime Emmy Award for casting Glee. He has been nominated for the Artios Awards 22 times and won twice, for casting Glee and Nip/Tuck.

Career
Robert J. Ulrich began his career as a stage actor, but realized he would not be successful. He moved into casting and says he learned more about acting his first time behind the table than in his previous career.

Known for casting musical television series, Ulrich told The Hollywood Reporter that "it's so much more fun when you're doing a musical, because people are singing and your day's suddenly better". He developed this musical casting process for the show Rhapsody, which did not get greenlit. Initially, he would have auditionees sing a cappella or with a backing track, but insisted on bringing a live pianist for the callbacks, saying in 2020 that "great singers are better with a piano and less trained singers are much better with a piano". He has also said that having live piano sets actors at ease. The pianist he found for the Rhapsody callbacks was Brad Ellis, whom he would use for subsequent musical auditions as well as integrating into shows like Glee. Ulrich's musical casting process has not changed since Rhapsody, and he encourages actors to showcase themselves. He has also opined that for television, he considers acting ability above singing and that actors from the stage "should bring it down for the screen". Sometimes for auditions later in a show a pianist will not be used.

Ulrich became involved with Glee through his business partner Eric Dawson, who had worked with creator Ryan Murphy on multiple occasions; Dawson suggested Ulrich should be involved due to his musical background. While working on the show he helped develop the reality series The Glee Project, which he described as an extension of the comedy-musical's casting process. In 2021, The Hollywood Reporter wrote that Ulrich does not find musical casting challenging, as he has many connections with triple threat performers; for Zoey's Extraordinary Playlist he cast several actors he had seen for prior auditions, including Jane Levy, who had previously auditioned for him for The Rocky Horror Picture Show: Let's Do the Time Warp Again, and Michael Thomas Grant and Alex Newell who had been contestants on The Glee Project.

He is affiliated with professional guilds The Academy of Television Arts and Sciences, the Casting Society of America, the Producers Guild of America, and Teamsters Local 399.

He was also a producer of Billy Boy, a 2017 film written by and starring Glee performers Melissa Benoist and Blake Jenner.

Personal life
He is married to Kim Johnston Ulrich. The couple judged the annual "Valley's Got Talent" in Ulrich's hometown of Modesto, California, together.

Filmography

Film

Television 
All roles only casting unless noted.

Theatre

Awards and nominations
In over 30 years in casting, Ulrich and his company Ulrich/Dawson/Kritzer Casting (UDK) have been nominated for over twenty Artios Awards and eight Emmy Awards.

References

External links
 

Living people
Male actors from Modesto, California
American casting directors
Year of birth missing (living people)